General Film Distributors (GFD), later known as J. Arthur Rank Film Distributors and Rank Film Distributors Ltd., was a British film distribution company based in London. It was active between 1935 and 1996, and from 1937 it was part of the Rank Organisation.

General Film Distributors was created in 1935 by the British film distributor C. M. Woolf (1879–1942) after he had resigned from Gaumont British and closed his distribution company Woolf & Freedman Film Service.

In 1936, J. Arthur Rank and the paper magnate Lord Portal, convinced him to make it a daughter company to their General Cinema Finance Corporation, which just had acquired the British distribution rights for all Universal Pictures titles (by buying a large chunk of Universal in the US). One year later it became the cornerstone in The Rank Organisation.

General Film Distributors kept its own name within the Rank Organisation until 1955, when it was renamed J. Arthur Rank Film Distributors, which in turn was renamed Rank Film Distributors Ltd. in 1957. Rank Film Distributors was acquired by Carlton Communications in 1997 and closed.

It was C.M. Woolf's secretary who devised the man-with-a-gong trademark which was adopted by the Rank Organisation when it was founded in 1937. Athletes who played the Gongman in the film sequence over the years, included boxer Bombardier Billy Wells and wrestler Ken Richmond. Also, George Francis Moss Snr played the Gongman.

During the 20 years General Film Distributors had its original name, the company distributed over 450 mainstream films. A British DVD distributor, active since 2005, uses the same name but is unrelated to this company.

References

External links
Francis Donald Klingender, Stuart Legg: Money Behind the Screen (1937), pages 37-41 Retrieved 2012-10-31

Film distributors of the United Kingdom